Petkevich is a gender-neutral Slavic surname. Notable people with the surname include:

John Misha Petkevich (born 1949), American figure skater
Natalia Petkevich (born 1972), Belarusian politician

See also
 Pietkiewicz

Belarusian-language surnames